Bearer of the Sword can refer to:

Abu Sayyaf, an Islamist separatist group based in and around the southern Philippines
An office at the coronation of English Kings and Queens
Bearer of the sword (Hungary), an office at the coronation of the Hungarian monarch
Miecznik, an office in the Kingdom of Poland and after Union of Lublin in Polish-Lithuanian Commonwealth

See also
The Sword Bearer, 2006 Russian action film
Swordbearer (disambiguation)